Karina Aktouf is an Algerian Canadian actress. She is most noted for her role in the film Montreal, White City (Montréal la blanche), for which she garnered a nomination for Best Actress at the 19th Quebec Cinema Awards in 2017.

She also appeared in the television series Les héritiers Duval, Jasmine, Ramdam and Med.

References

External links

Canadian film actresses
Canadian television actresses
Actresses from Quebec
Algerian emigrants to Canada
Canadian Muslims
Living people
Year of birth missing (living people)